"Seeds of Dream" is the fourth single by the band Girl Next Door and it was released on April 15, 2009. Seeds of Dream was used as the commercial song for Glico's Ice no Mi, while Reasons for Tears was used as a commercial song for Tokyo's 2016 Olympic-Paralympic bid.

CD track listing 
 Seeds of Dream
 Reasons for Tears
 Gūzen no Kakuritsu (Oh My Gold Mix)
 Escape (Ice Cream Mix)

DVD track listing 
 Seeds of Dream (Music Video)

Charts

Oricon sales chart

Billboard Japan

External links 
  

2009 singles
Girl Next Door (band) songs
2009 songs
Avex Trax singles